Careers TV is a Canadian daytime television series about the world of occupations. The program airs on A and Access.

External links 
 Careers TV website

CTV 2 original programming